Plasmodium fischeri is a parasite of the genus Plasmodium subgenus Lacertamoeba. 

Like all Plasmodium species P. fischeri has both vertebrate and insect hosts. The vertebrate hosts for this parasite are reptiles.

Description 

The parasite was first described by Ball and Pringle in 1965.

Geographical occurrence 

This species is found in Kenya, Africa.

Clinical features and host pathology 

The only known host of this species is Fischer's or the Eastern Usambara chameleon (Chamaeleo fischeri). This host species is also known as Chamaeleo excubitor, Bradypodion fischeri and Kinyongia fischeri.

References 

fischeri